Bulbophyllum windsorense, commonly known as the thread-tipped rope orchid, is a species of epiphytic orchid that has small pseudobulbs partly hidden by brown, papery bracts. Each pseudobulb has a single fleshy, dark green, grooved leaf and one or two cream-coloured or greenish flowers. It mainly grows near the breezy tops of trees, especially Callitris macleayana trees and is endemic to tropical North Queensland.

Description
Flowering occurs from May to August.

Taxonomy and naming
Bulbophyllum windsorense was first formally described in 1964 by Bruce Gray and David Jones who published the description in Austrobaileya from a specimen collected by Gray on the Windsor Tableland. The specific epithet (windsorense) refers to the type location.

Distribution and habitat
The thread-tipped rope orchid usually grows on the tops of rainforest trees, especially Callitris macleayana where it is exposed to breezes, but also on the trunks of tree ferns and on trees remaining in cleared paddocks. It is found between the Cedar Bay National Park and the Paluma Range National Park.

References

windsorense
Orchids of Queensland
Endemic orchids of Australia
Plants described in 1989